Peschanoye is an rural locality (a village) under the administrative jurisdiction of the town of oblast significance of Svetly in Kaliningrad Oblast, Russia. Population:

References 

Rural localities in Kaliningrad Oblast